Mauro Baldi (born 31 January 1954) is an Italian former Formula One and endurance driver who raced for the Arrows, Alfa Romeo and Spirit teams.

He was the seventh of 9 drivers who completed the informal Triple Crown in endurance racing.

Biography
Baldi started his career in rallying in 1972 and turned to circuit racing in 1975 with the Italian Renault 5 Cup. By 1980 he had become a top Formula 3 driver, winning the Monaco F3 Grand Prix and the 1981 European Formula 3 Championship with eight victories. In 1982 he signed to drive for Arrows before moving to Alfa Romeo in 1983, scoring a fifth place in Zandvoort. When Benetton became Alfa Romeo's team sponsor in 1984, Baldi lost his drive, and joined the underfunded Spirit team until 1985.

After retiring from Formula One he went to enjoy a successful career in sports car racing, driving for the works Martini-Lancia team in 1984 and 1985. In 1986, he switched to a Porsche 956 from Richard Lloyd Racing's outfit, returning to a works drive in 1988 with the Sauber-Mercedes team, with whom Baldi won the 1990 FIA World Sports Prototype Championship for Drivers, sharing the car with Jean-Louis Schlesser. In 1991 and 1992 he was a driver for Peugeot. He had a brief return to F1, doing most of the test driving for the Modena Lambo project.

Returning to sports cars, he won the Le Mans 24 Hours race in 1994, sharing the "road-going" Dauer 962 Le Mans (a modified Porsche 962) with Yannick Dalmas and Hurley Haywood. He also won the 24 Hours of Daytona in 1998 and 2002, and the 12 Hours of Sebring, again in 1998, with Arie Luyendyk and Didier Theys.

Racing record

Career summary

† As Baldi was a guest driver, he was ineligible for championship points.

Complete Formula One results
(key)

24 Hours of Le Mans results

Sources

Profile at www.grandprix.com

1954 births
Living people
Sportspeople from Reggio Emilia
Italian racing drivers
Italian Formula One drivers
Arrows Formula One drivers
Alfa Romeo Formula One drivers
Spirit Formula One drivers
FIA European Formula 3 Championship drivers
Champ Car drivers
24 Hours of Le Mans drivers
24 Hours of Le Mans winning drivers
24 Hours of Daytona drivers
American Le Mans Series drivers
World Sportscar Championship drivers
24 Hours of Spa drivers
12 Hours of Sebring drivers
Peugeot Sport drivers
Mercedes-AMG Motorsport drivers
EuroInternational drivers
Porsche Motorsports drivers
Dale Coyne Racing drivers
TOM'S drivers
Sauber Motorsport drivers